The NCAA Women's Division I Swimming and Diving Championships is an annual college championship in the United States. The meet is typically held on the second-to-last weekend (Thursday-Saturday) in March, and consists of individual and relay events for female swimmers and divers at Division I schools.

The swimming-portion of the meet takes place in a 25-yard pool, except in 2000 and 2004 which swam in a 25-meter course.

History
Swimming was one of twelve women's sports added to the NCAA championship program for the 1981-82 school year, as the NCAA engaged in battle with the Association for Intercollegiate Athletics for Women (AIAW) for sole governance of women's collegiate sports. The AIAW continued to conduct its established championship program in the same twelve (and other) sports; however, after a year of dual women's championships, the NCAA conquered the AIAW and usurped its authority and membership.

Events

Individual swimming events
 
Freestyle events
50-yard Freestyle (1982−present)
100-yard Freestyle (1982−present)
200-yard Freestyle (1982−present)
500-yard Freestyle (1982−present)
1,650-yard Freestyle (1982−present)
Backstroke events
100-yard Backstroke (1982−present)
200-yard Backstroke (1982−present)
Breaststroke events
100-yard Breaststroke (1982−present)
200-yard Breaststroke (1982−present)
Butterfly events
100-yard Butterfly (1982−present)
200-yard Butterfly (1982−present)
Medley events
200-yard individual medley (1982−present)
400-yard individual medley (1982−present)

Relay swimming events
 
Freestyle relay events
200-yard freestyle relay (1982−present)
400-yard freestyle relay (1982−present)
800-yard freestyle relay (1982−present)
Medley relay events
200-yard medley relay (1982−present)
400-yard medley relay (1982−present)

Diving events
Diving events
One-meter diving (1982−present)
Three-meter diving (1982−present)
Platform diving (1990−present)

Discontinued events

Individual swimming events
 
Backstroke events
50-yard Backstroke (1982−1983)
Breaststroke events
50-yard Breaststroke (1982−1983)
Butterfly events
50-yard Butterfly (1982−1983)
Medley events
100-yard individual medley (1982−1983)

Champions

Team titles

Championship records

|-bgcolor=#DDDDDD
|colspan=9|
|-

|-bgcolor=#DDDDDD
|colspan=9|
|-

|-bgcolor=#DDDDDD
|colspan=9|
|-

|-bgcolor=#DDDDDD
|colspan=9|
|-

|-bgcolor=#DDDDDD
|colspan=9|
|-

|-bgcolor=#DDDDDD
|colspan=9|
|-

See also
AIAW Intercollegiate Women's Swimming and Diving Champions
List of college swimming and diving teams
NCAA Men's Division I Swimming and Diving Championships
NCAA Women's Division II Swimming and Diving Championships
NCAA Women's Division III Swimming and Diving Championships
 NAIA Women's Swimming and Diving Championships

References
NCAA Division I women's swimming and diving

 
Swimming and Diving - Division I
Swimming competitions in the United States
Women's sports in the United States
Recurring sporting events established in 1982